is a former Japanese football player.

Playing career
Mori was born in Saitama Prefecture on November 21, 1977. After graduating from Dohto University, he joined J1 League club Cerezo Osaka in 2000. Although he played several matches as center back every season, he could not play many matches. The club was also relegated to J2 League from 2002. In 2003, he moved to J2 club Mito HollyHock. He became a regular player as center back and played many matches until 2004. However his opportunity to play decreased in 2005 and he retired end of 2005 season.

Club statistics

References

External links

1977 births
Living people
Seisa Dohto University alumni
Association football people from Saitama Prefecture
Japanese footballers
J1 League players
J2 League players
Cerezo Osaka players
Mito HollyHock players
Association football defenders